Sin Seok-gyo (born 20 September 1971) is a South Korean field hockey player. He competed in the men's tournament at the 1996 Summer Olympics.

References

External links
 

1971 births
Living people
South Korean male field hockey players
Olympic field hockey players of South Korea
Field hockey players at the 1996 Summer Olympics
Field hockey players from Seoul
Asian Games medalists in field hockey
Field hockey players at the 1994 Asian Games
Field hockey players at the 2002 Asian Games
Asian Games gold medalists for South Korea
Medalists at the 1994 Asian Games
Medalists at the 2002 Asian Games
1998 Men's Hockey World Cup players
2002 Men's Hockey World Cup players
20th-century South Korean people
21st-century South Korean people